The Malaysia Premier Futsal League (Wanita) is the top flight women's futsal league in Malaysia. The league is the women's category of Malaysia Premier Futsal League, managed by the Football Association of Malaysia (FAM). The competition has been founded in 2007.

History 
The Liga Futsal Kebangsaan (Wanita) has been founded when the women categories was introduced for the Liga Futsal Kebangsaan in 2007. For 2007 season, FELDA has become the official sponsor for the competition and the competition name has incorporated the sponsor name and called as Liga Futsal Kebangsaan FAM/FELDA and the partnership continue until the end of 2015 season.

Selangor, captained by the instrumental Shahila Yunus won back-to-back titles in the 2009-10 season and 2010-11 season.

The league has been resumed for a new season in February 2017 and competed among six clubs.

Clubs 
Below are the list of clubs which competed in the 2017 season women's categories.
 Ally Group
 ATM
 Felda United
 PDRM
 Perak
 Sarawak

Champions

Final results

2007 season

2008/2009 season

2009/2010 season

2010 season

2011/2012 season

Players award

Golden Boot winners

Best player

Best goalkeeper

Best Young player

See also 
 Liga Futsal Kebangsaan
 Malaysia national men's futsal team
 Malaysia women's national futsal team

References

External links 
 Football Association of Malaysia
 Arena Futsal Malaysia

Women
Women
Futsal
Women's futsal leagues
2007 establishments in Malaysia
Sports leagues established in 2007